Mountains May Depart is a 2015 Mandarin-language drama and the 8th feature film directed by Jia Zhangke. It competed for the Palme d'Or at the 2015 Cannes Film Festival. and was also selected to be shown in the Special Presentations section of the 2015 Toronto International Film Festival.

Plot
In 1999 Fenyang, 25-year-old shopkeeper Tao finds herself in a love-triangle between Liangzi, a good friend and poor laborer in a local coal mine who has unrequited feelings for her, and Jinsheng, a well-off gas station owner who, despite being pompous and cruel, she is more attracted to. Tao showing affection for Jinsheng sets off a confrontation between her two suitors. Tao and Jinsheng decide to get married. Liangzi, feeling incapable of maintaining a platonic friendship with Tao, leaves town.

In 2014, Tao is now divorced from Jinsheng and still living in Fenyang, running the gas station and being a prominent and generous woman in the city. Jinsheng has since remarried and lives in Shanghai and has become wealthy from investments. Liangzi works as a miner near Handan and has gotten ill. Tao and Jinsheng's son, Daole (pronounced Dollar in English) aged 7, comes to visit the funeral of Tao's father. Tao is upset by Daole's distance, and behaves surly towards him. Tao, knowing they are fated to be apart, decides to ride the slow train with Daole. As a parting gift, Tao gives Daole a set of keys for her house so that he can return to his home whenever he wants.

In 2025, Daole (now currently called Dollar) is attending college in Australia. He is constantly fighting with his father over his desire to drop out of college and have the freedom he was never granted in his childhood. He meets Mia, his Chinese language teacher, an older woman for whom he develops feelings and eventually begins a relationship with. Dollar shares with Mia how he still carries the keys his mother gave him when he was a young boy, and that he fears she may die even though they have not talked for years. Mia convinces him to fly back to China with her so that he can see Tao. The film ends with Tao dancing to Go West; any reunion with Daole (Dollar) is not seen.

Cast
Zhao Tao
Zhang Yi
Liang Jingdong
Dong Zijian
Sylvia Chang
Rong Zishan
Liang Yonghao
Liu Lu
Yuan Wenqian

Reception

Box office
The film earned  at the Chinese box office.

Critical reception
Mountains May Depart holds a 79/100 average on review aggregation site Metacritic. Peter Bradshaw of The Guardian wrote, "Jia Zhang-ke’s Mountains May Depart is a mysterious and in its way staggeringly ambitious piece of work from a film-maker whose creativity is evolving before our eyes."

Scott Foundas of Variety states "Mountains May Depart is never less than a work of soaring ambition and deeply felt humanism, as Jia longs not so much to turn back the hands of time, but to ever so slightly slow them down."

Derek Elley of Film Business Asia gave it a 5 out of 10, calling the film a "weakly written saga of friendship [that] goes way off the rails in the final part."

Music 
 "Go West" (1993) by the Pet Shop Boys
 "Take care" (1990) by Sally Yeh
Go West plays a prominent role in the film as the film opens to a scene on New Year's Eve 1999 with Tao happily dancing to the song with friends and closes in 2025 with a scene of Tao crying and dancing along to it near an old pagoda in the snow. Incidentally, in both scenes, Tao gestures with her arm to make waves, and "Tao" means waves in Chinese. In an interview with AV Club Jia states that he was attempting to evoke a "collective history for that generation."

References

External links

2015 drama films
2015 films
Chinese drama films
Jin Chinese-language films
Films directed by Jia Zhangke
Films set in 1999
Films set in 2014
Films set in 2025
Films set in Australia
Films set in China
Films shot in Australia
French drama films
Japanese drama films
Tianjin Maoyan Media films
2010s Mandarin-language films
2010s Japanese films
2010s French films